Macrorrhinia pinta is a species of snout moth in the genus Macrorrhinia. It was described by Bernard Landry and Herbert H. Neunzig in 1998 and is known from Pinta Island (from which its species epithet is derived), of the Galápagos Islands in Ecuador.

References

Moths described in 1998
Phycitinae